The 1976 Amateur World Series was the 24th Amateur World Series (AWS), an international men's amateur baseball tournament. The tournament was sanctioned by the International Baseball Federation (which titled it the Baseball World Cup as of the 1988 tournament). The tournament took place, for the fourth time, in Colombia, and was won by Cubaits 14th AWS victory.

There were 11 participating countries, including first-time participant South Korea.

Final standings

References
XXIV Baseball World Cup Colombia 

World Cup
Baseball World Cup
1976
1976 in Colombian sport